Michael Stich was the defending champion but lost in the third round to Jamie Morgan.

Todd Martin won in the final 7–6(7–4), 7–6(7–4) against Pete Sampras.

Seeds
The top eight seeds received a bye to the second round.

  Pete Sampras (final)
  Michael Stich (third round)
  Stefan Edberg (quarterfinals)
  Goran Ivanišević (third round)
  Todd Martin (champion)
  Boris Becker (second round)
  Cédric Pioline (second round)
  Wayne Ferreira (quarterfinals)
  Patrick Rafter (second round)
  MaliVai Washington (third round)
  Andrea Gaudenzi (second round)
  Richey Reneberg (first round)
  Jason Stoltenberg (third round)
  Mark Woodforde (first round)
  Jamie Morgan (quarterfinals)
  Jakob Hlasek (second round)

Draw

Finals

Top half

Section 1

Section 2

Bottom half

Section 3

Section 4

External links
 1994 Stella Artois Championships draw

Singles